The following lists events that happened during 1860 in South Africa.

Incumbents
 Governor of the Cape of Good Hope and High Commissioner for Southern Africa: Sir George Grey.
 Lieutenant-governor of the Colony of Natal: John Scott.
 State President of the Orange Free State:
 Esaias Reynier Snijman (acting until 7 February).
 Marthinus Wessel Pretorius (from 8 February).
 President of the Executive Council of the South African Republic:
 Marthinus Wessel Pretorius (until 14 September).
 Johannes Hermanus Grobler (acting from 15 September until 5 December).
 Stephanus Schoeman (acting from 6 December).

Events
February
 8 – Marthinus Wessel Pretorius becomes State President of the Orange Free State.

May
 1 – The seat of the South African Republic (ZAR) government is officially transferred from Potchefstroom to Pretoria.
 4 – The Orange Free State signs a peace treaty with Moshoeshoe I at Wittebergen, near Winburg, ending the first Basuto War.

June

 26 – The Natal Railway Company officially opens the first revenue-earning railway line in South Africa, a  line from Market Square in Durban to the newly built Point station at Durban Harbour.

September
 15 – Johannes Hermanus Grobler becomes acting President of the Executive Council of the South African Republic.
 17 – The Alfred Dock in Table Bay, Cape Town is officially opened by sixteen-year-old Prince Alfred, second son of Queen Victoria.

December
 6 – Stephanus Schoeman unconstitutionally ousts J.H. Grobler as acting President of the Executive Council of the South African Republic.

Unknown date
 The first indenture of Indian workers arrive in Natal to work in the sugar industry.
 The first telegraph service in South Africa starts operating between Cape Town and Simonstown.
 The penny post is started in Cape Town.

Births
 29 April – John Robinson Royston, soldier and farmer, is born in Durban.

Deaths

Railways

Railway lines opened

 26 June – Natal – Durban to Point, .

Locomotives
 20 March – The Cape Town Railway and Dock Company takes delivery of eight broad gauge 0-4-2 tender locomotives for service on the Cape Town-Wellington line, which is still under construction.
 13 May – The Natal Railway Company's first locomotive, the broad gauge engine "Natal", is landed at Durban.

References

South Africa
Years in South Africa
History of South Africa